Baby Alone in Babylone is an album by Jane Birkin. The album was released in 1983 and was the first collaboration between Birkin and Serge Gainsbourg since their split. Michelle de Rouville was credited for the photography.

Track listing
Words and music by Serge Gainsbourg
"Baby Lou" words by Serge Gainsbourg, music by Alain Chamfort and Michel Pelay. This song had previously appeared on Chamfort's 1977 album Rock'n Rose.
"Baby alone in Babylone" words by Serge Gainsbourg, music based on the 3rd movement of the 3rd symphony by Johannes Brahms

 "Baby Lou"
 "Fuir le bonheur de peur qu'il ne se sauve"
 "Partie perdue"
 "Norma Jean Baker"
 "Haine pour aime"
 "Overseas telegram"
 "Con c'est con ces consequences"
 "En rire de peur d'être obligée d'en pleurer"
 "Rupture au miroir"
 "Les dessous chics"
 "Baby alone in Babylone"

Personnel
Jane Birkin - vocals
Alan Parker - guitar
Brian Odgers - bass
Dougie Wright - drums
Alan Hawkshaw - keyboards, arrangements, conductor
Jim Lawless - percussion
Technical
Philippe Lerichomme - producer
Dick Plant, Dominique Blanc-Francard - engineer
Michelle de Rouville - photography

Amours des feintes
1983 albums
Philips Records albums